The Spendthrift (German: Der Verschwender) is a 1953 Austrian historical musical film directed by Leopold Hainisch and starring Attila Hörbiger, Josef Meinrad and Maria Andergast. It is an adaptation of Ferdinand Raimund's play of the same name.

The film's sets were designed by the art director Gustav Abel. It was shot in Gevacolor.

Cast

References

Bibliography 
 Fritsche, Maria. Homemade Men in Postwar Austrian Cinema: Nationhood, Genre and Masculinity. Berghahn Books, 2013.

External links 
 

1953 films
1950s musical fantasy films
1950s historical musical films
Austrian historical musical films
1950s German-language films
Films directed by Leopold Hainisch
Films set in the 19th century
Austrian films based on plays
1950s historical fantasy films